Thomas A. Duffy (April 6, 1906 – April 11, 1979) was an American lawyer and politician from New York.

Life
He was born on April 6, 1906, in Brooklyn, New York City. The family moved to Astoria, Queens, when Thomas was still a child. He graduated from Regis High School in 1926. In 1938, he married Helen M. Fisher (born 1908), and they had three children. The couple lived in Jackson Heights, Queens.

Duffy was a member of the New York State Assembly (Queens Co., 4th D.) from 1949 to 1956, sitting in the 167th, 168th, 169th and 170th New York State Legislatures. On February 7, 1956, he ran in a special election for the State Senate seat vacated by the resignation of Frank D. O'Connor, but was defeated by Republican Bernard Tompkins. In November 1956, Duffy defeated Tompkins who ran for re-election.

Duffy was a member of the New York State Senate (8th D.) from 1957 to 1965, sitting in the 171st, 172nd, 173rd, 174th and 175th New York State Legislatures.

He was a justice of the New York City Civil Court from 1967 to 1976.

He died on April 11, 1979, in Calvary Hospital in the Bronx.

Sources

1906 births
1979 deaths
People from Queens, New York
Democratic Party New York (state) state senators
Democratic Party members of the New York State Assembly
New York (state) state court judges
20th-century American judges
20th-century American politicians